Mimi is a 2014 South Korean television series starring Shim Chang-min and Moon Ga-young. It aired on cable channel Mnet from February 21 to March 14, 2014 on Fridays at 23:00 for 4 episodes.

The horror/mystery/romance drama is inspired by the 2007 Lee Myung-se film M.

Plot
Min-woo is a 28-year-old introverted writer of webtoons who has partial memory loss. One day, he finds a memo on his desk calendar, and because of it, writes a new webtoon titled December 8, which becomes an instant hit. But as the webtoon gets even more popular, Min-woo feels pressure from work and begins to suffer from severe headaches. He strives to recover his lost memories from the time he was an 18-year-old high school student, especially those of his first love, Mimi, as he unravels their mysterious fate.

Cast
Shim Chang-min as Han Min-woo
Moon Ga-young as Mimi
Shin Hyun-been as Jang Eun-hye
Jung Ji-soon as team leader of manhwa department
Yoon Da-kyung as Min-woo's mother
Go Won as Min-woo's homeroom teacher
Choi Young-soo as Sung-woo
Kim Joon-goo as punishment soldier
Lee Yeon-kyung as Mimi's aunt
Byun Baek-hyun as Umbrella man

Soundtrack
The official theme of the series, Because I Love You, was performed by Wendy (Son Seung-wan) who later would debut in now-popular girl-group Red Velvet along other SM rookies, Kang Seulgi and Bae Joohyun (Irene).

International broadcast
It aired in Thailand on PPTV beginning March 15, 2015, dubbed as Patitin Rak Raek Pob. ("ปฏิทินรักแรกพบ", literally: Love at First Sight Calendar).

References

External links
Mimi at Mnet 

2014 South Korean television series debuts
2014 South Korean television series endings
Television series by CJ E&M
Mnet television dramas
Television series by SM C&C